Dikhuiyeh (also Romanized as Dīkhū’īyeh and Dikhoo’yeh; also known as Deh Kūh, Dehkuye, Dehkūyeh, and Dīkhū) is a village in Khabar Rural District, in the Central District of Baft County, Kerman Province, Iran. At the 2006 census, its population was 616, in 137 families.

References 

Populated places in Baft County